The Majority leader of the New York State Senate is elected by the majority of the members of the New York State Senate. The position usually coincides with the title of temporary president of the State Senate, who presides over the session of the State Senate if the lieutenant governor of New York (who is ex officio president of the State Senate) is absent. The temporary president of the State Senate becomes acting lieutenant governor for the remainder of the unexpired term in case of a vacancy in the office of lieutenant governor, or until a new lieutenant governor is appointed In case of a vacancy in the offices of both the governor and lieutenant governor at the same time, the temporary president of the State Senate becomes Acting Governor. If the double vacancy occurs until three months before the mid-term state elections, a special election for governor of New York and lieutenant governor is held. If the double vacancy occurs later, the Temporary President of the State Senate acts as governor until the end of the unexpired term. The temporary president of the State Senate retains both majority leadership and a seat in the State Senate while acting as lieutenant governor or governor.

As of January 2019, Democrat Andrea Stewart-Cousins is the Senate majority leader.

History
The position of president pro tempore of the New York State Senate was created as a standing office by a constitutional amendment in 1873. The President pro tempore was elected for the duration of the biennial senatorial term which comprised two sessions, the first in an even-numbered year, the other in the following odd-numbered year.

Before this time, a President pro tempore was elected only in case of vacancy (the President pro tem acting as lieutenant governor for the remainder of the term), or if the lieutenant governor was absent. In practice, this new arrangement transferred much power from the lieutenant governor to the President pro tempore, whose political position became comparable to that of the Speaker of the New York State Assembly.

After the impeachment of Governor William Sulzer in October 1913, Lt. Gov. Martin H. Glynn became governor, and President pro tempore Robert F. Wagner became acting lieutenant governor. At the time Wagner, as acting lieutenant governor, was considered to be president of the Senate and it was deemed necessary to elect another member as president pro tempore/majority leader, and John F. Murtaugh was chosen.

The precedent of 1913–1914 caused some confusion after the death of Lt. Gov. Thomas W. Wallace in 1943. It was unclear if the Majority Leader had to give up his post upon becoming acting lieutenant governor, and if such an acting lieutenant governor became President of the Senate for the remainder of the unexpired term.

There was a lengthy dispute over the leadership of the Senate during June and July 2009. On June 8, 2009, Democrats Hiram Monserrate and Pedro Espada Jr., joined the 30 Republican members of the State Senate to attempt to issue a motion to replace current Majority Leader Malcolm Smith with Minority Leader Dean Skelos. Following the precedent of 1913, the temporary presidency and the majority leadership would have been separated again under this scenario. Since the office of lieutenant governor fell vacant after Lieutenant Governor David Paterson ascended to the governorship upon Governor Eliot Spitzer's resignation, the majority leaders (Bruno, Skelos and Smith) have acted as lieutenant governors. The motions put forward on June 8 also sought to select Pedro Espada as Temporary President of the State Senate, which would have installed him as acting lieutenant governor. The Democrats have disputed the legitimacy of the motions put forward on June 8. The New York State Senate has been providing a running update of the legal proceedings since June 11, 2009. The dispute ended July 9, 2009, when Senator Espada announced he would return to the Democratic caucus and take on the position of majority leader, while it was also announced that former majority leader Malcolm Smith had assumed the title of president pro tempore, and John L. Sampson served as Democratic conference leader with the understanding he would assume the presidency at an undetermined future date. Following the 2010 election and the Republican victory in the Senate, Senator Dean Skelos from Long Island served as both temporary president and majority leader, but resigned in May 2015 in the midst of corruption charges.

Traditionally, the positions of acting lieutenant governor and acting governor were considered to be tied to the post of Majority Leader. This means that if the Majority Leader resigns, or is ousted from office, or if the majority changes and a new majority leader is chosen, the offices of acting lieutenant governor or acting governor were transferred at the same time to the new majority leader.

Democrat Andrea Stewart-Cousins became Senate majority leader in January 2019, the first woman and African-American to do so.

Presidents pro tempore (1874–1938)

Majority leaders since 1939

Notes

1